Pal or Pál is a Hungarian masculine given name, the Hungarian version of Paul. It may refer to:
 Pál Almásy (1818–1882), Hungarian lawyer and politician
 Pál Bedák (born 1985), Hungarian boxer
 Pál Benkő (1928–2019), Hungarian-American chess player
 Pál Csernai (1932–2013), Hungarian football player and manager
 Pál Dárdai (footballer, born 1951) (died 2017), Hungarian football player and manager
 Pál Dárdai (born 1976), Hungarian football coach and retired player
 Pál Palkó Dárdai (born 1999), German-Hungarian footballer, son of the above
 Pál Dunay (1909–1993), Hungarian fencer
 Paul Erdős (1913–1996), Hungarian mathematician
 Paul I, Prince Esterházy (Pál Eszterházy) (1635–1713), first Prince Esterházy of Galántha 
 Paul II Anton, Prince Esterházy (Pál Antal Eszterházy) (1711–1762), Hungarian prince
 Paul III Anton, Prince Esterházy (Pál Antal Eszterházy) (1786–1866), Hungarian prince
 Pál Gábor (1932–1987), Hungarian film director and screenwriter
 Pál Gerevich (born 1948), Hungarian fencer
 Pál Jávor (actor) (1902–1959), Hungarian actor, and the country's first male movie star
 Pál Joensen (born 1990), Faroese swimmer 
 Pál Kinizsi (1432–1494), Hungarian general in the service of the Hungarian King Matthias Corvinus
 Pál Kitaibel (1757–1817), Hungarian botanist and chemist
 Pál Koppán (1878–1951), Hungarian track and field athlete
 Pál Kovács (1912–1995), Hungarian athlete
 Pál Losonczi (1919–2005), Hungarian communist politician
 Pál Maléter (1917–1958), Hungarian military leader of the 1956 Hungarian Revolution
 Pal Molnar (born 1952), Hungarian journalist
 Pál Rosty de Barkóc (1830–1874), Hungarian nobleman, photographer and explorer
 Pál Sajgó (1922–2016), Hungarian cross country skier and biathlete
 Pál Schmitt (born 1942), Hungarian Olympic fencer and politician, President of Hungary from 2010 to 2012
 Pál Szécsi (1944–1974), Hungarian pop singer
 Pál Teleki (1879–1941), Hungarian politician who served as prime minister of the Kingdom of Hungary from 1920 to 1921 and from 1939 to 1941
 Pál Teleki (footballer) (1906–1985), Hungarian footballer 
 Pál Titkos (1908–1988), Hungarian footballer 
 Pál Tomori (c. 1475–1526), Catholic monk, archbishop of Kalocsa, Hungary, and commander of the Hungarian army at the Battle of Mohács
 Pál Turán (1910–1976), also known as Paul Turán, Hungarian mathematician 
 Pál Várhidi (1931–2015), Hungarian football player and manager
 Pál Völner (born 1962), Hungarian jurist and politician
 Pál Wágner (born 1935), Hungarian rower

Pal may refer to:
 Pal Aron (born 1971), British actor
 Pal Dukagjini (1411–1458), Albanian nobleman
 Pal Dushmani (died 1457), Albanian clergyman
 Pal Engjëlli (1416–1470), Albanian clergyman
 Pal Gazulli (1405–1470), Albanian clergyman
 Pal Gropa, Albanian lord
 Pal Homonai (1904–2010), Albanian artist
 Pal Kastrioti, Albanian ruler
 Pal Mirashi (1925–2001), Albanian footballer
 Pal Rakes, American singer
 Pal Sam Oeun, Cambodian politician
 Pal Shazar (born 1952), American musician
 Pal Singh Purewal, Canadian scholar
 Pal Sinn (born 1959), Hong Kong musician

See also
 Paul (name)

Hungarian masculine given names